Sazae may refer to:

A comic strip
 Sazae-san, a Japanese comic strip.

A mollusk
 The mollusk Turbo cornutus is known as "sazae" in Japan, where it is eaten as a delicacy.